Viktoria Uladzimirauna Kavaliova (born 9 July 1994) is a Belarusian former competitive ice dancer. With partner Yurii Bieliaiev, she has won two medals on the ISU Challenger Series and two national titles. They have competed in the final segment at four ISU Championships – 2012 Junior Worlds in Minsk, Belarus; 2014 Junior Worlds in Sofia, Bulgaria; 2016 Europeans in Bratislava, Slovakia; and 2017 Europeans in Ostrava, Czech Republic.

Programs 
(with Bieliaiev)

Competitive highlights 
GP: Grand Prix; CS: Challenger Series; JGP: Junior Grand Prix

With Bieliaiev

References

External links 

 

Belarusian female ice dancers
1994 births
Living people
Figure skaters from Minsk